Chetanna is a 2014 drama film directed by Ikechukwu Onyeka and produced by Chigozie Atuanya.

Background
Chetanna is an Igbo language film shot in Enugu State, Southern Nigeria. It was screened at the 2014 World Igbo Festival of Arts and Cultureat the Frontiers Cultural Museum in Staunton, Virginia U.S. Upon the premiering of Chetanna on October 11, 2014 at the Igbo Catholic Community Centre, Houston, the film became the first Igbo language film to be premiered in the United States. It also toured and premiered in five cities in Nigeria including Awka, Aba, Enugu, Owerri and Umuahia.

Critical review
Upon its release, Chetanna was received positively. Chido Nwangwu of USAfrica commended Chigozie Atuanya for promoting Igbo language through the film, further stating that: "The Chetanna movie is an important contribution to the issue of "vanishing" Igbo language; following in the groundbreaking Igbo movie, Living in Bondage".

Cast
 Chigozie Atuanya
 Queen Nwokoye
 Ebube Nwagbo
 Ebele Okaro

Awards and nominations

References

External links
 

2014 films
Igbo-language films
2014 drama films
Nigerian drama films